BMG Rights Management GmbH (also known simply as BMG) is an international music company based in Berlin, Germany. It combines the activities of a music publisher and a record label. 

BMG was founded in October 2008 after Bertelsmann sold its stake in Sony BMG. From 2009 to 2013, the investment firm KKR held 51% of the company, which became one of the world's largest music publishers during that time. BMG is 100% owned by Bertelsmann and one of the group's eight business divisions. The portfolio includes rights in songs and recordings by artists such as Kylie Minogue, Craig David, Avril Lavigne, The Rolling Stones, Tina Turner, The Cranberries, David Bowie, Roger Waters, Iggy Pop, Quincy Jones, Lenny Kravitz Morrissey, 5 Seconds of Summer, KSI, Eraserheads, Francis Magalona, Rivermaya. and Peter Frampton.

History

Music at Bertelsmann

In the 1950s, Bertelsmann entered the music business when it added music to its book club. Ariola, a record label, was launched and Sonopress, a pressing plant, was established. In 1975, Ariola opened an office in the United States. Bertelsmann acquired Arista Records in 1979 and RCA Records in 1985, thereby becoming one of the world's largest music companies. Its various subsidiaries were brought together in 1987 to form Bertelsmann Music Group (BMG), which did business in a number of genres, including folk, pop and, in particular, classical music.

In response to declining sales in the overall music market, Bertelsmann agreed to merge its record label interests with Sony in 2003; the company was called Sony BMG. Furthermore, in 2006, Bertelsmann sold its subsidiary BMG Music Publishing to Vivendi. Having reached the conclusion that established music publishing companies and record labels were not appropriate for an increasingly digital music business, Bertelsmann sold its stake in the Sony BMG joint venture in 2008. The company was subsequently renamed Sony Music Entertainment.

Launch of the new BMG
In October 2008, Bertelsmann launched the new BMG with a small portfolio of recorded music rights of around 200 artists it retained from Sony BMG. It declared it would pursue a business model focused on fairness, service and transparency.

The launch of the new BMG came amidst the 2008 financial crisis, and within two weeks of the collapse of Lehman Brothers. Since Bertelsmann could not supply the required funds on its own, a 51% stake was sold to financial investor KKR in 2009. Bertelsmann retained 49% and the right to appoint the company's management. The transaction allowed BMG to increase its equity ratio.

International expansion
Initially, Bertelsmann had announced that the new BMG would focus on the European broadcast market. After KKR became the majority shareholder, the company set its sights on expanding internationally. A key step towards achieving this goal was acquiring Cherry Lane Music Publishing in 2009, which provided BMG with its first foothold in the United States. BMG made several other purchases in 2010, including Evergreen Copyright Acquisitions.

In 2011, Bug Music was bought by BMG, followed by music publisher R2M Music in 2012. Bertelsmann was also reported to be interested in buying EMI, but EMI was ultimately acquired by Universal Music Group and Warner Music Group (record labels) and Sony/ATV Music Publishing (songwriters). The regulatory authorities approved the deal subject to some conditions, including the sale of several labels. BMG was thus able to acquire Mute Records (2012) and Sanctuary Records (2013), as well as the publishing catalogues of EMI Virgin Music and Famous Music UK from Sony/ATV.

Becoming a group division
In 2013, KKR sold its stake in BMG to Bertelsmann, making it the sole shareholder of the company. Under the leadership of Chief Executive Officer Thomas Rabe, who had been a key driver of BMG's expansion during his time as Chief Financial Officer, Bertelsmann again cited music as one of its strategic growth areas.

In 2013, the company began to represent rights to songs by Robbie Williams and the Rolling Stones. Record labels were also added to the portfolio including Union Square Music (distributor of Universal Music's ZTT Records and Stiff Records), Vagrant Music and Infectious Music (2014), as well as S-Curve Records and Rise Records (2015). Other acquisitions followed in 2016, including the label ARC Music and the catalog of The End Records. By acquiring Basement, BMG entered the market in Brazil, one of Bertelsmann's growth regions. The company also signed an agreement with Warner Music's Alternative Distribution Alliance for the physical and digital distribution of music, allowing BMG to consolidate its longstanding sales structures. BMG further expanded by entering the Chinese market in cooperation with Alibaba, allowing the online company to distribute the work of musicians and composers via its web channels while securing copyrights.

In the 2015 financial year, BMG was part of the Corporate Investments division at Bertelsmann. In 2016, the media group turned the subsidiary into a stand-alone division. Today, BMG is considered a prime example of how growth platforms are created and leveraged at Bertelsmann.

Acquisition of BBR Music and new labels
In 2017, BMG announced the purchase of BBR Music Group, including the labels Broken Bow Records, Red Bow Records, Stoney Creek Records, Wheelhouse Records and the music publisher Magic Mustang Music. With a value of more than 100 million dollars, the transaction was the largest recorded music acquisition in the company's history. BMG thus improved its position in the country music segment and ensured its long-term presence in the Nashville music industry and its overall impact on the United States market.

In 2022, BMG announced its first new British record label within the group since 2009, Tag8 Music. This label was set up in association with ex-Bros member Craig Logan and his management company Logan Media Entertainment, with Tag8 Music featuring established acts such as Pixie Lott, Roachford, and Louise Redknapp as part of its roster. On the Official Albums Chart Top 100 of 4 November 2022, the label charted its first hit album in the form of Blue's Heart & Soul.

Corporate structure

BMG's parent enterprise is BMG Rights Management GmbH, a limited liability company according to German law. The company's objective is "the marketing of music, as well as its development and delivery" for use in media, at concerts and for other purposes. BMG has numerous subsidiaries and shareholdings, for example, BMG Rights Management (Europe) GmbH. In addition to Germany, BMG is present in Australia, Brazil, China, France, Italy, Spain, the UK, the Benelux countries, the United States, Canada, and Scandinavia.

BMG's senior management includes Hartwig Masuch (Chief Executive Officer), Thomas Coesfeld (Chief Financial Officer), Ama Walton (General Counsel and Chief Human Resources Officer) and Ben Katovsky (Chief Operating Officer). Masuch has been a member of Bertelsmann's Group Management Committee since 2013.

In the 2018 financial year, BMG posted revenues of €545 million. Rights and licenses accounted for 91.1% and products and merchandise 8.9%. Almost half of its revenues (44.1%) were generated in the United States. Other important markets were the United Kingdom (24.7%), Germany (6.3%) and France (3.9%).

Business model
BMG offers musicians the services generally provided by music publishers and record labels. Unlike its major competitors, it runs them under the same roof and on the same technology platform. More recently, it has added film, television, and books to its roster of services.

Publishing
BMG publishing represents the rights of songwriters like Mick Jagger, Louis Tomlinson, 5 Seconds of Summer, Keith Richards, Kylie Minogue, Ringo Starr, Nena, Roger Waters, Alice Merton, Billy Idol, Cat Stevens, Poo Bear, Aphex Twin, Storm Gordon, Bebe Rexha, Bruno Mars, Iggy Pop, Bibi Bourelly, Jean Michel Jarre, Jess Glynne, Kurt Cobain, David Bowie, Gary Numan, Death Cab for Cutie, Kings of Leon, Bring Me the Horizon, Blondie, George Ezra, Johnny Cash, Robbie Williams, Tame Impala, Gene Clark, Fontaine Brown, Carla Olson, Pat Robinson, John Lee Hooker, Del Shannon, three 6 mafia , and many more.

In addition, BMG owns the publishing catalogues of Chrysalis Music, Virgin, Famous Music UK, R2M Music, Talpa Music, Union Square Music, Cherry Lane Music, Francis Dreyfus Music, Alberts, Adage IV, Bug Music, Hornall Brothers Music Ltd. and Primary Wave.

Production music
BMG has a significant library of production music (library music), for use in films, television, advertising, and other media. These catalogues include including MusicDirector (part of Talpa Music), Human Music, Music Beyond, X-Ray Dog, Beds & Beats, Valentino Production Music, Immediate Music, AXS Music, Altitude Music, and Must Save Jane.

BMG also has output deals with several production studios, including The Asylum, Turner Broadcasting, Fremantle, Amblin Partners, ITV Studios, The Pokémon Company, and Netflix.

Recordings
BMG recording artists include 311, A Perfect Circle, Jason Aldean, blink-182, Blondie, Craig David, Cypress Hill, Dido, Fergie, Natalie Imbruglia, JLS, Lenny Kravitz, Kylie Minogue, Louis Tomlinson, Max Giesinger, Avril Lavigne, Good Charlotte, Roger Waters, Bryan Ferry, Richard Ashcroft, Fatboy Slim, Steps, Sugar Ray, Marianne Faithfull, The Kinks, Ry X, Nakhane, Journey, Patty Smyth, Adel Tawil, Scorpions, KitschKrieg, and The Prodigy.

BMG owns the catalogues of several record labels, which include Rise Records, Mute Records, Trojan Records, Vagrant Records, Strictly Rhythm Records, Union Square Music, Verse Music Group, Sanctuary Records, S-Curve Records, Skint Records, The Echo Label, Infectious, and the BBR Music Group.

Labels
43B
BBR Music Group
Broken Bow Records
Stoney Creek Records
Wheelhouse Records
Rise Records
S-Curve Records (back catalogue)
Infectious Music
Vagrant Records
BMG Chrysalis
The Echo Label
Go-Feet Records
MAM Records
Mute Records (pre-2010 catalogue)
Union Square Music
Salvo
Metro
Skint Records
Loaded Records
Skyblaze Recordings
Sanctuary Records Group
Castle Communications
Pye Records
Precision Records and Tapes
Transatlantic Records
Sugar Hill Records
CMC International
Mayan Records
Neat Records
Noise Records
RAS Records
Trojan Records
Jet Records
Upsetter Records
Urban Records
Countdown Media
Alshire/Somerset
Everest Records
Mediaphon
Dobre Records
SRP Records
Alto Records
RAM Records
RBC Records
World Circuit Records
Disques Dreyfus
Albert Music
Albert Productions
The End Records
Verse Music Group
Golden Records
Bethlehem Records
Salsoul Records
West End Records
Pete Waterman Entertainment
Paracadute
Strictly Rhythm (back catalogue)
Cavalcade Recordings
BMG Talpa Music (Netherlands)
BMG Production Music
Cheyenne Records
Intertwine (joint venture with Eshy Gazit)
Modern Recordings
Telamo
Renew Records
OM Records (joint-venture with Olympique de Marseille)

Awards
2016, 2017, 2018: "Independent Publisher of the Year" by American Society of Composers, Authors and Publishers
2018: "Production Music Awards" for BMG Production Music
2018: "Publisher of the Year", A&R Awards, United Kingdom

References

External links
Official website of BMG

Bertelsmann subsidiaries
Entertainment companies established in 2008
German companies established in 2008
German record labels
Kohlberg Kravis Roberts companies
Mass media companies established in 2008
Music publishing companies of Germany
Record label distributors
Record labels established in 2008